The Holocaust Expropriated Art Recovery Act of 2016 is an Act of Congress that became law in 2016. It is intended to provide victims of Nazi persecution (and their heirs) opportunity to recover works of art confiscated or misappropriated by the Nazis.

In 2018, a New York judge awarded two Nazi-looted drawings "to the heirs of an Austrian Holocaust victim". According to the BBC, the drawings, "Woman Hiding Her Face" and "Woman in a Black Pinafore", by Egon Schiele, "will go to the heirs" of Fritz Grünbaum, who was killed in the Dachau concentration camp in 1941. Art dealer Richard Nagy claimed to be the rightful owner to the works, however the Manhattan state court ruled against him, citing this precise Act.

References

Acts of the 114th United States Congress
The Holocaust